Jamshid Hashemi (also spelled Hashimi; 25 April 1936 – 26 August 2013) was an Iranian-born trader in arms and other commodities convicted of fraud in the UK in 1999. Hashemi had a 9-year relationship with the UK's Secret Intelligence Service (MI6), beginning soon after his arrival in the UK in 1984. Hashemi and his brother Cyrus Hashemi played a role in the 1980 October Surprise affair (Jamshid later testified to the House October Surprise Task Force in 1992) and in the mid-1980s Iran-Contra affair.

Career
Hashemi and his brother Cyrus Hashemi supported the 1979 Iranian Revolution, and Jamshid was appointed to oversee the national radio network, where he worked with Mehdi Karroubi's brother Hassan. In late 1979 Jamshid flew to London at his brother's invitation, where he met John Shaheen. Shaheen procured a multiple-entry US visa for Jamshid within a day, and Jamshid flew to the US on 1 January 1980. Hashemi and his brother Cyrus Hashemi went on to play a role in the 1980 October Surprise affair (Jamshid later testified to the House October Surprise Task Force in 1992) and in the Iran-Contra affair. 

Upon arriving in the US after the Revolution, Hashemi set up RRC Co Inc in Stamford, Connecticut, which Hashemi described in an affidavit as "an import-export company ... (which) originally dealt in commodities such as rice and sugar, construction machinery parts and Oriental rugs". Towards the end of 1980 Hashemi was approached by a contact on behalf of the Iranian Air Force in regards to acquiring aircraft spare parts. The company shipped millions of dollars' worth of spare parts and related goods to Iran, with billing handled via a London office. RRC's operations ceased in late 1981 over a dispute between partners regarding allocation of profits.

In July 1984 the Hashemis were tipped off by the CIA that the FBI was in pursuit of them for arms deals violating the Iran arms embargo; both settled in Britain, with Cyrus dying of a rare leukemia in 1986.

Soon after his move to the UK in 1984, Jamshid Hashemi developed a relationship with the UK's Secret Intelligence Service (MI6) which would last nine years. Hashemi broke off the relationship in 1993 after the UK Government refused to issue him a British passport. At one time Hashemi gave the UK Conservative Party "£55,000 after meeting Margaret Thatcher at the home of the then foreign secretary, Geoffrey Howe." Hashemi deals that MI6 approved of included the supply of £350 million worth of Silkworm missiles from China to Iran in 1987 (the agency had supported this by sending an agent to China in 1985 to help arrange the deal) and the transfer of Portuguese 155mm ammunition.

In July 1997 Hashemi was arrested in Dublin whilst travelling to the US for a second triple heart bypass. He was released in February 1999, having pleaded guilty to three fraud charges and one of using a false passport, while four charges were dropped to avoid UK security matters being aired in open court. At the time of his release The Guardian said that "A source close to the case yesterday described MI6 as lucky." The judge in the case described Hashemi as a "ruthless international conman", with the Serious Fraud Office accusing Hashemi of setting up companies to defraud suppliers of at least £3m using non-existent commodity deals with Iran. The judge also noted that the three-year sentence would have been longer had Hashemi not had a record of supplying "valuable information" to MI6, as attested in court by Hashemi's anonymous case officers. Hashemi's victims included the US trading firm Octagon, which at the time of the 1994 deal was listed on the NASDAQ.

Notes

References

1936 births
2013 deaths
Arms traders
Iranian businesspeople
Iran–Contra affair
Iran hostage crisis